WVRN may refer to:

 WVRN (FM), a radio station (88.9 FM) licensed to Wittenberg, Wisconsin, United States
 WVRN-TV, a defunct television station (channel 63) in Richmond, Virginia, United States